Carpophilus ligneus is a species of sap-feeding beetle in the family Nitidulidae. It is found in Europe and Northern Asia (excluding China).

References

Further reading

 
 

Nitidulidae
Articles created by Qbugbot
Beetles described in 1864